Houstonia may refer to:
 Houstonia, Missouri, a city in Missouri
 Houstonia (plant), a genus of flowering plants, belonging to the madder family (Rubiaceae)
 Houstonia (magazine), a magazine
 Houstonia (insect), a genus of wasp, belonging to the family Eurytomidae